Sally Warner is a writer of fiction for children and young adults and of books on creativity. She made the Lily series and Emma series for children's books. Sally Warner was born in New York City and grew up in Connecticut and California, where her family moved when she was eight years old. [1]

Schools
She attended public schools in Pasadena (Noyes Elementary School, Eliot Junior High School, and Pasadena High School). She then received her B.A. degree from Scripps College in Claremont, California, and her B.F.A. and M.F.A. degrees in fine arts from Otis Art Institute in Los Angeles.[1]

Bibliography

Books on art
Encouraging the Artist in Your Child
Encouraging the Artist in Yourself
Making Room For Art

Younger children
Not-So-Weird Emma
Only Emma
Best Friend Emma
Super Emma
Excellent Emma
Happily ever Emma
Smart About the First Ladies
Sweet and Sour Lily
Leftover Lily
Private Lily
Accidental Lily
EllRay Jakes is not a chicken (2011) "Warner's clever plotting brings an unexpected and rewarding ending. ... and Harper's [illustrator] cartoons, incorporated throughout, further enliven the story."
EllRay Jakes Stands Tall
EllRay Jakes the Recess King
EllRay Jakes Rocks the Holidays!
EllRay Jakes is Magic
EllRay Jakes and the Beanstalk
EllRay Jakes the Dragon Slayer
EllRay Jakes Walks the Plank
EllRay Jakes is a Rock Star

Older children and young adults
Twilight Child
A Long Time Ago Today
This Isn't About The Money "Warner (Sort of Forever) relays another moving story of loss and healing."
Sister Split
Sort of Forever "Warner has previously explored the themes of friendship and change, but never more powerfully or affectingly."
How to Be a Real Person (in just one day) "Warner has shaped a haunting, ultimately hopeful story, whose heroine is indisputably real."
Finding Hattie "Even with its period setting, this atmospheric tale portrays the timeless teenage struggle to find one's own way."
Bad Girl Blues
Totally Confidential "Those willing to look past the improbable premise will find this an otherwise tight and well-told story, full of empathy for kids' anxieties and concerns."
Dog Years "...Warner makes her children's book debut with this intermittently poignant novel."
Some Friend "Effective characterization, credible dialogue and recurrent imagery neatly integrated into an affecting plot add up to choice middle-grade fiction."
Ellie and the Bunheads "The expansive storytelling and comic exaggeration produce high kid appeal..."
It's Only Temporary
Lala Land

References

External links
 http://www.sallywarnerbooks.com/ - author's website

American children's writers
Living people
American women children's writers
Writers from New York City
Writers from Pasadena, California
Scripps College alumni
Year of birth missing (living people)
Otis College of Art and Design alumni